The Quaker Meeting-house on Hester and Elizabeth Streets, in the Lower East Side of Manhattan, New York City, was a meetinghouse for the Religious Society of Friends, built in 1818. Recorded in 1876 by the New York Express that it “has for a long time been the office of the New York Gas Light Company,” now Consolidated Edison.  It was presumed demolished.

References 

1818 establishments in New York (state)
Churches completed in 1818
Churches in Manhattan
Consolidated Edison
Demolished buildings and structures in Manhattan
Demolished churches in New York City
Former churches in New York City
Lower East Side
Quaker meeting houses in New York City
Religious buildings and structures in New York City